Villiam Dahlström (born 30 June 1997) is a Swedish football striker who plays for Halmstad.

Club career
On 30 December 2021, Dahlström signed a three-year contract with Halmstad.

References

1997 births
Living people
Swedish footballers
Association football forwards
FC Gute players
Degerfors IF players
Halmstads BK players
Superettan players
Allsvenskan players